Geneviève Senger (born 1956 in Mulhouse) is a French children's book author and novelist.

Works 
 La Guerre des marrons, Toulouse, France, Éditions Milan, ill. d’Alfred Morera, series "Zanzibar" 1993, 229 p. 
 L’Été de toutes les cerises, ill. by Sylvie Montmoulineix, Paris, Nathan, series "Bibliothèque internationale", 1993, 125 p. 
 Une vallée prisonnière, Toulouse, France, Éditions Milan, ill. by Jean-Louis Henriot, series "Zanzibar", 1995, 151 p. 
 Destination macadam, ill. by Thierry Daniel, Paris, Hachette jeunesse, series "Verte aventure : aventure humaine", 1995, 125 p. 
 B comme Béatrice, ill. by Anne Romby, Paris, Éditions Rageot, series "Cascade", 1995, 156 p. 
 Les Patates magiques, ill. by Thierry Christmann, Paris, Éditions Rageot, series "Cascade", 1996, 92 p. 
 Le Manoir invisible, ill. by Philippe Chauvet, Tournai, Belgium, Casterman, series "Romans Casterman huit et plus : comme la vie", 1997, 103 p. 
 Quand j’aurai un grand frère, Paris, Éditions Syros jeunesse, series "Mini souris sentiments", 1998, 29 p. 
 Seuls à la maison, ill. by Thierry Christmann, Paris, Éditions Rageot, series "Cascade", 1999, 121 p. 
 Le Cigogneau, Paris,  Éditions Flammarion, 1999, 191 p. 
 Une grosse dispute, ill. by Thierry Christmann, Paris, Éditions Rageot, series "Cascade", 2000, 59 p. 
 Le chat qui voulait dire la vérité et autres fables d'’Israël, ill. by Marie Mathieu, Paris, Éditions ER jeunesse, series "Fables et légendes d'Israël", 2000, 64 p. 
 Tous les jours en vacances, ill. by Christian Maucler, Paris, Éditions Rageot, series "Cascade", 2001, 117 p. 
 Dis-moi qui tu aimes, Paris, Éditions Bayard jeunesse, series "Cœur grenadine", 2001, 117 p. 
 Mon premier euro de poche, ill. by Camille Meyer, Paris, Éditions Rageot, series "Cascade", 2002, 44 p. 
 L’Ile du premier amour, Paris, Éditions Bayard jeunesse, series "Cœur grenadine", 2003, 144 p. 
 Une histoire entre sœurs, Paris, Éditions J’ai lu jeunesse, series "J'ai lu. Jeunesse : journal", 2003, 93 p. 
 Moi, j’aime gagner, with Philippe Diemunsch, Paris, Éditions Flammarion, series "Castor cadet", 2003, 44 p. 
 L’Ennemi de cœur, ill. by Karen Laborie, Champigny-sur-Marne, France, Éditions Lito, series "Moi, j'aime les romans", 2004, 136 p. 
 Chut ! Les enfants parlent, ill. by Pierre Bailly, Champigny-sur-Marne, France, Éditions Lito, series "Moi, j'aime les romans", 2004, 89 p. 
 La Plus Belle Lettre d'amour, ill. by Karen Laborie, Champigny-sur-Marne, France, Éditions Lito, series "La collec' des filles", 2004, 138 p. 
 Meurtre au lycée, Paris, Éditions Rageot, series "Heure noire", 2004, 153 p. 
 La Voix de son maître, Paris, Éditions de la Martinière, 2006, 286 p. 
 Trois sœurs dans un appartement, T1, Lola, ill. by Aline Bureau, Champigny-sur-Marne, France, Éditions Lito, series "La collec' des filles", 2005, 136 p. 
 L’Inconnue de la chambre 313, Paris, Éditions Rageot, series "Heure noire", 2005, 184 p. 
 Trois sœurs dans un appartement, T2, Marylou, ill. by Aline Bureau, Champigny-sur-Marne, France, Éditions Lito, series "La collec' des filles", 2005, 
 Mon amoureux du bout du monde, Paris, Éditions Pocket Jeunesse, series "Toi + moi = cœur", 2005, 155 p. 
 Trois sœurs dans un appartement, T3, Alice, ill. by Aline Bureau, Champigny-sur-Marne, France, Éditions Lito, series "La collec' des filles", 2006, 144 p. 
 Vive la mode!, ill. by Yann Hamonic, Paris, Éditions Rageot, series "Cascade", 2006, 154 p. 
 La Disparue du canal, Paris, Éditions Rageot, series "Heure noire", 2006, 151 p. 
 La Mémoire du lièvre, Paris, Éditions Pygmalion, series "Suspense", 2007, 306 p. 
 Regarde-moi !, Paris, Éditions Oskar jeunesse, series "Junior", 2010, 200 p. 
 Les Larmes et l’Espoir, with Élise Fischer, Paris, Les Presses de la Cité, 2011, 423 p. 
 Pour te venger, Joy, Paris, Éditions Oskar jeunesse, series "Junior", 2011, 188 p. 
 Un cœur entre deux rives, Paris, Les Presses de la Cité, series "Terres de France", 2012, 343 p. 
 La Maison Vogel, Paris, Éditions Calmann-Lévy, series "France de Toujours et d'Aujourd'hui", 2013, 441 p. 
 L’Enfant de la Cerisaie, Paris, Éditions Calmann-Lévy, series "France de Toujours et d'Aujourd'hui", 2014, 416 p. 
 Le Fil d’or, Paris, Éditions Calmann-Lévy, series "France de Toujours et d'Aujourd'hui", 2015, 650 p. 
 La Dynastie des Weber, Paris, Éditions Calmann-Lévy, series "France de Toujours et d'Aujourd'hui", 2015, 816 p. 
 Les Jumeaux du Val d’amour, Paris, Éditions Calmann-Lévy, series "France de Toujours et d'Aujourd'hui", 2016, 360 p. 
 La Promesse de Rose, Paris, Éditions Calmann-Lévy, series "France de Toujours et d'Aujourd'hui", 2017, 360 p.

External links 
 Official website 

1956 births
Living people
Writers from Mulhouse
20th-century French women writers
21st-century French women writers
French children's writers
French women children's writers